Tsagaan Khas (meaning white swastika) or Dayar Mongol is a Mongolian neo-Nazi organisation that claims to have 3,000 members, though this claim is disputed. Other sources claim the organisation to have "more than 1,000 members". According to Reuters in 2013, they had "only 100-plus members". Nyam Puruv, a Mongolian historian, estimated in 2009 that the group actually had only dozens of members. The organisation's electoral affiliate received 1 percent or less of the vote in the 2008 Mongolian legislative elections.

The group was founded by Ariunbold Altankhuum. It was founded in the 1990s. The group came into being during Mongolia's transition to a market economy after traditional nomadic lifestyles became less viable and with a background of increasing economic inequality.

According to Altankhuum, "The reason we chose this way is because what is happening here in Mongolia is like 1939, and Hitler's movement transformed his country into a powerful country." Altankhuum has also expressed a positive view of Francisco Franco and Genghis Khan.

The group's co-founder, who goes by the alias "Big Brother", said, "Adolf Hitler was someone we respect. He taught us how to preserve national identity ... We don't agree with his extremism and starting the Second World War. We are against all those killings, but we support his ideology. We support nationalism rather than fascism." The group's members dress in Nazi attire (such as uniforms resembling that of the Schutzstaffel) and make use of the "sieg heil" greeting, the Iron Cross, and the Nazi eagle. They have justified their use of Nazi imagery by pointing out that the swastika has Asian origins.

Big Brother has claimed that the group does not promote crime and that it expels "criminal elements" from its membership, as well as requiring all members to have a good education. One of the group's leaders is an interior designer. He has also claimed that the group works closely with other ultra-nationalist groups in Mongolia.

The group's members are characterized by their extreme anti-Chinese sentiment and opposition to interracial marriage. One follower of the group has expressed the view that, "We have to make sure that as a nation our blood is pure. That's about our independence... If we start mixing with Chinese, they will slowly swallow us up. Mongolian society is not very rich. Foreigners come with a lot of money and might start taking our women." The group has been accused of targeting interracial couples, immigrants, prostitutes, and the LGBT community, including by promotion of violence. The group has targeted Mongolian women who have had relationships with Chinese men, shaving their hair off and sometimes tattooing their forehead.

Some negative attitudes towards Chinese people in Mongolia from groups such as Tsagaan Khas may be traced to the Soviet Union's policy which cast China as a threat to Mongolia, so as to receive allegiance from Mongolia. During this Sino-Soviet split, the Mongolian People's Republic gave the Soviet Union its steadfast support in all matters.

In 2013, they tried to shift their focus to fighting pollution resulting from mining in Mongolia. The group has appeared at mining operations, demanding to see paperwork and sometimes has sabotaged the mining operations if they are displeased with how they are managed. According to Altankhuum, the group wants to fulfill a role which they say the local authorities have failed at concerning foreign mining companies. They demand soil samples from the mining operations, in order to check for soil contamination. In an interview with Reuters, Altankhuum stated, "[O]ur purpose changed from fighting foreigners in the streets to fighting the mining companies."

References

See also
 Neo-Nazism in Mongolia
 Mongolian anti-Chinese sentiment

Anti-Chinese sentiment in Asia
Environmentalism in Mongolia
Far-right politics in Asia
Mongolian nationalism
Political organizations based in Mongolia
Tengriism
Third Position
Tibetan Buddhism in Mongolia
Neo-Nazism in Asia
Turanism